Unione Sportiva Darfo Boario Società Sportiva Dilettantistica is an Italian association football club located in Darfo Boario Terme, Lombardy. It currently plays in Serie D.

History 
The club was founded in 1937.

Serie D 
In the season 1987–88 it was promoted, for the first time, to Interregionale and in the season 1997–98 after 11 seasons it was relegated to Eccellenza Lombardy.

In the season 2005–06 it was promoted again to Serie D and in the season 2011–12 after 7 seasons was to be relegated to Eccellenza Lombardy, but the club will continue to play in Serie D after being readmitted to fill the vacancies created.

Colors and badge 
Its colors are green and black.

Current squad
As of 31 December 2018

References

External links 
 Official site

 
Football clubs in Italy
Association football clubs established in 1937
Football clubs in Lombardy
1937 establishments in Italy